Mramorovo pri Pajkovem is a small settlement northwest of Ravnik in the Municipality of Bloke in the Inner Carniola region of Slovenia.

References

External links
Mramorovo pri Pajkovem on Geopedia

Populated places in the Municipality of Bloke